John Alexander Graham (born 4 March 1978) is an English cricketer. Graham is a right-handed batsman who bowls right-arm medium pace.

Graham started his cricket career playing Second XI cricket for Durham, which he did between 1996 and 2000. While doing so, he appeared for England Under-19s against Pakistan Under-19s during England's 1996 tour there. He played 2 Youth Test matches without success, and one Youth One Day International, in which he scored a fifty. He later made his debut for Northumberland against Bedfordshire in the 2000 Minor Counties Championship. He played Minor counties cricket for Northumberland from 2000 to 2005, making 20 Minor Counties Championship appearances and 16 MCCA Knockout Trophy appearances. He made his List A debut against Staffordshire in the 2nd round of the 2002 Cheltenham & Gloucester Trophy, which was played in 2001. He made 3 further List A appearances, the last of which came against Middlesex in the 2005 Cheltenham & Gloucester Trophy. In his 4 List A matches, he scored 78 runs at an average of 19.50, with a high score of 55. This score came against Staffordshire in 2001.

Personal life
John Graham works as a geography teacher at North Gosforth Academy, Seaton Burn. He currently resides in the rural-urban fringe town of Seaton Delaval, near Newcastle upon Tyne, with his wife and their three children.

Graham is known locally for his eccentric personality and sense of humour.

References

External links
John Graham at ESPNcricinfo
John Graham at CricketArchive
Seaton Burn College

1978 births
Living people
Cricketers from Newcastle upon Tyne
English cricketers
Northumberland cricketers